Gryllus cayensis, known generally as the keys wood cricket or South Florida taciturn wood cricket, is a species of cricket in the subfamily Gryllinae. It is found in North America.

References

Further reading

 

cayensis
Articles created by Qbugbot
Insects described in 2001